Cristiano Filipe Marques Pascoal (born 8 June 1992) is a Portuguese footballer who plays for US Esch as a defender.

Football career
On 26 October 2016, Pascoal made his professional debut with Santa Clara in a 2016–17 Taça da Liga match against Vitória Setúbal.

References

External links

Cristiano Pascoal at FuPa

1992 births
Living people
Sportspeople from Coimbra
Portuguese footballers
Portuguese expatriate footballers
Association football defenders
Liga Portugal 2 players
Campeonato de Portugal (league) players
G.D. Tourizense players
Sport Benfica e Castelo Branco players
C.D. Santa Clara players
S.C. Praiense players
Expatriate footballers in Luxembourg